Ruvungane Peaks is a group of small peaks just north of Ryvingen Peak in the south part of the Borg Massif in Queen Maud Land. Mapped by Norwegian cartographers from surveys and air photos by Norwegian-British-Swedish Antarctic Expedition (NBSAE) (1949–52) and named Ruvungane.
 

Mountains of Queen Maud Land
Princess Martha Coast